Kim Young-ho (born April 9, 1971 in Nonsan, Chungcheongnam-do, South Korea) is a South Korean foil fencer.

At the 2000 Olympics in Sydney, he won the gold medal in individual foil, defeating Ralf Bissdorf of Germany in the final. He became the first Olympic Champion in fencing from Korea, and the first Asian man to win an Olympic Gold medal in fencing.

At the 1997 World Championships he had perhaps one of the most heroic losses in top level fencing. With approximately 2 minutes left in the final period, Kim was down 11-3 to Sergei Golubitsky of Ukraine. As direct elimination fencing bouts go to 15 touches, most fencers would presume Kim was about done and was fencing for pride. 8 touches later Kim had tied the score.

He and Golubitsky (as Sergei stated on his "Golden Bouts" tape, "and now the nightmare begins....the comeback of Kim") traded touches until Kim finally lost 15–14. At la belle (tied for the last touch, 14-14), Kim almost pulled the win out, but his attack failed to register (although he had struck valid target) and Golubitsky dodged a bullet, allowing him the chance to win the bout.

References

External links 
 Sergei Golubitsky vs Kim Young-ho

1971 births
Living people
South Korean male foil fencers
Fencers at the 1992 Summer Olympics
Fencers at the 1996 Summer Olympics
Fencers at the 2000 Summer Olympics
Olympic fencers of South Korea
Olympic gold medalists for South Korea
Olympic medalists in fencing
Medalists at the 2000 Summer Olympics
Asian Games medalists in fencing
Fencers at the 1994 Asian Games
Fencers at the 1998 Asian Games
Fencers at the 2002 Asian Games
People from Nonsan
Asian Games gold medalists for South Korea
Asian Games silver medalists for South Korea
Asian Games bronze medalists for South Korea
Medalists at the 1994 Asian Games
Medalists at the 1998 Asian Games
Medalists at the 2002 Asian Games
South Korean Buddhists
Sportspeople from South Chungcheong Province